Melanolagus bericoides, the bigscale deep-sea smelt, is a species of deep-sea smelt found in tropical and subtropical oceans to a depth of . Its original name is Scopelus bericoides Borodin and belongs to the Melanolagus Kobyliansky family.

References
 

Bathylagidae
Monotypic fish genera
Fish described in 1929